The Mi River is one of three largest tributaries of the Xiang River and a right-bank tributary in the middle reaches of the Xiang in Hunan, China. The river rises in Tianxin Village of Xiacun Township, Yanling County. Its main stream runs generally southeast to northwest through Yanling, Chaling, You and Hengdong counties, and it joins the Xiang in Xintang Town of Hengdong.

References

Rivers of Hunan